Bomi may refer to:

 Yoon Bo-mi, an idol singer in the South Korean group A Pink
 Bomi County, county in Liberia
 Tubmanburg, also known as Bomi, capital of Bomi County in Liberia
 Bomi, Sierra Leone
 Bomi County, Tibet, county in Tibet
 Bomi (bomber missile), a program/design of Bell Aircraft directed by Walter Dornberger.